The suburb of Farm Cove is located in eastern Auckland, New Zealand. The suburb is in the Howick ward, one of the thirteen administrative divisions of Auckland city.

The Rotary Walkway Reserve runs through Farm Cove.

Demographics

Farm Cove had a population of 2,583 at the 2018 New Zealand census, an increase of 75 people (3.0%) since the 2013 census, and an increase of 111 people (4.5%) since the 2006 census. There were 846 households, comprising 1,233 males and 1,350 females, giving a sex ratio of 0.91 males per female. The median age was 43.1 years (compared with 37.4 years nationally), with 492 people (19.0%) aged under 15 years, 453 (17.5%) aged 15 to 29, 1,182 (45.8%) aged 30 to 64, and 456 (17.7%) aged 65 or older.

Ethnicities were 67.6% European/Pākehā, 5.0% Māori, 2.7% Pacific peoples, 30.2% Asian, and 2.9% other ethnicities. People may identify with more than one ethnicity.

The percentage of people born overseas was 37.4, compared with 27.1% nationally.

Although some people chose not to answer the census's question about religious affiliation, 49.8% had no religion, 38.0% were Christian, 0.1% had Māori religious beliefs, 2.0% were Hindu, 1.0% were Muslim, 1.6% were Buddhist and 2.4% had other religions.

Of those at least 15 years old, 699 (33.4%) people had a bachelor's or higher degree, and 204 (9.8%) people had no formal qualifications. The median income was $39,400, compared with $31,800 nationally. 528 people (25.3%) earned over $70,000 compared to 17.2% nationally. The employment status of those at least 15 was that 984 (47.1%) people were employed full-time, 330 (15.8%) were part-time, and 57 (2.7%) were unemployed.

Education
The name means "The resting place of the canoe". The schools are both coeducational and are on adjacent sites. Rolls are as of  There is also a small public kindergarten, located behind Wakaaranga Primary school.

Shops
There is a small shopping centre, Farm Cove Shopping Centre, which includes a dairy, hairdresser, bakery, and language school.

References

External links
Photographs of Farm Cove held in Auckland Libraries' heritage collections.

Suburbs of Auckland
Populated places on the Tāmaki River
Howick Local Board Area